Sorata Municipality (Aymara: Surat'a) is the first municipal section of the Larecaja Province in the La Paz Department, Bolivia. Its capital is Sorata. The Illampu - Janq'u Uma massif is located within the municipality, site of the 17th highest lake in the world, Laguna Glaciar.

Geography 
The Cordillera Real traverses the municipality. The highest peaks of the municipality are  Illampu and Janq'u Uma. Other mountains are listed below:

Languages 
The languages spoken in the Sorata Municipality are mainly Aymara and Spanish.

See also 
 Ch'uch'u Jawira
 Ch'usiq Uta
 Warus Quta

References

External links 
 Population data and map of Sorata Municipality

Municipalities of La Paz Department (Bolivia)